The Baptist General Convention of Texas (BGCT) is the oldest surviving Baptist convention in the state of Texas. It is affiliated with the Southern Baptist Convention and the Baptist World Alliance. In 2009, the BGCT began to also go by the name Texas Baptists to better communicate who they are. The convention's offices are located in Dallas, Texas, though convention staff are located across the state. The president of the BGCT is Jason Burden and the Executive Director is David Hardage.

History
There were Baptists among the first Anglo-American settlers of Texas, but under Spain (and later Mexico), non-Catholic religious worship was prohibited. The first Baptist sermon preached in Texas was preached by Joseph Bays of Missouri as early as 1820. The first Sunday School in Texas was organized by a Baptist, Thomas J. Pilgrim, at San Felipe de Austin in 1829. Mexican authorities forced the Sunday School to disband and hindered the attempts of the earliest Baptist preachers.

The first Baptist church in Texas was organized in Illinois by Elder Daniel Parker. Parker visited Texas in 1832, and concluded that the Mexican laws clearly prohibited organizing a church in Texas. He also decided the immigration of an organized church into the state would not violate the colonization laws. To this end, he and several others constituted a church in Illinois, then traveled to Texas by wagon train, arriving in Austin Colony January 20, 1834. Parker held a strict predestinarian theology, as well as his controversial Two-Seed theology. Like those travellers, the church was named Pilgrim. This church, and those churches of like faith that followed, remained aloof from the majority of Baptists in Texas. Pilgrim church is the oldest Baptist church in Texas, and survives today as a Primitive Baptist church.

The first missionary Baptist church in Texas was organized at Washington-on-the-Brazos by Z. N. Morrell in 1837. The following year, Isaac Reed and R. G. Green formed the Union Baptist Church, about 5 miles north of Nacogdoches, Texas. This church, now known as the Old North Church, is the oldest surviving missionary Baptist church in Texas, and cooperates with the Baptist General Convention of Texas. After Texans achieved independence from Mexico, Baptists began to flourish in Texas. Many churches were formed in the days of the Republic of Texas. With the multiplication of churches came also the organization of associations. The first association was the Union Baptist Association, organized in 1840.

As the local associations increased, missionary Baptists became interested in cooperation together on the broader state level. In 1848 representatives from four associations met at Anderson, Texas, and started the Baptist State Convention of Texas. In 1853, the Baptist General Association of Texas was organized at Larissa in Cherokee County in east Texas. Other bodies were formed to serve their regions (and often due to dissatisfaction with the other bodies), such as the East Texas Baptist Convention (org. 1877 at Overton) and the North Texas Baptist Missionary Convention (org. 1879 at Allen). B. H. Carroll, pastor of First Baptist in Waco, was instrumental in getting the General Association, during its 1883 meeting, to propose that five conventions in Texas consider the expediency of uniting as one body. The North Texas Convention dissolved, and recommended its churches affiliate with the Baptist State Convention. The East Texas Convention also joined the state convention. In 1886, the Baptist General Association of Texas and the Baptist State Convention of Texas ratified the terms of merger and consolidated into one body called The Baptist General Convention of Texas. In addition to Carroll, other leaders in the merger included S. A. Hayden, J. B. Cranfill, J. B. Link, J. M. Carroll, R. T. Hanks, and G. W. Smith.

According to a denomination census released in 2020, it claimed 5,341 churches and 1,708,415 members.

Divisions
The harmony of unification in the 19th century gave way to three major divisions in the 20th century—the S. A. Hayden controversy and the formation of the Baptist Missionary Association of Texas in 1900, the Fundamentalist–Modernist controversy and the formation of the Premillennial Missionary Baptist Fellowship by J. Frank Norris in 1933, and the conservative/moderate controversy and the formation of the Southern Baptists of Texas Convention in 1998. The body has nevertheless maintained a steady progress throughout the 20th century.

Beliefs
The Convention is a member of the Southern Baptist Convention and the Baptist World Alliance.

Partner ministries

Seminaries 
 George W. Truett Theological Seminary

Universities
Baptist University of the Américas
Baylor University
Dallas Baptist University
East Texas Baptist University
Hardin-Simmons University
Houston Christian University
Howard Payne University
University of Mary Hardin-Baylor
Wayland Baptist University

Boarding schools
San Marcos Baptist Academy

Human services
BCFS
Buckner International
Children at Heart Ministries
STCH Ministries

Medical
Baptist Health Foundation of San Antonio 
Baptist Health System (indirect)
Baptist Hospitals of Southeast Texas
Baylor Scott & White Health 
Baylor University Medical Center at Dallas
Scott & White Medical Center
Hendrick Health System
Hillcrest Baptist Medical Center 
Valley Baptist Health System
BSA Health System (indirect)

News 
 The Baptist Standard

See also
Christianity in the United States

References

Texas Baptists: A Sesquicentennial History, H. Leon McBeth (1998)
A History of Texas Baptists, by James Milton Carroll
Centennial Story of Texas Baptists, L. R. Elliott, editor
Encyclopedia of Southern Baptists, Norman W. Cox, et al., editors
Flowers and Fruits from the Wilderness, by Z. N. Morrell
Missionary Baptists in Texas: 1820-1998, by Oran H. Griffith
The Blossoming Desert: A Concise History of Texas Baptists, by Robert A. Baker

External links
 

 

Organizations based in Dallas
Baptist Christianity in Texas
Religious organizations established in 1886
Baptist denominations established in the 19th century
1886 establishments in Texas